Dimapur II Assembly constituency is one of the 60 Legislative Assembly constituencies of Nagaland state in India. It is part of Dimapur district and is reserved for candidates belonging to the Scheduled Tribes. It is also part of Nagaland Lok Sabha constituency.

Members of Legislative Assembly
 1974: Lhomithi, Naga Nationalist Organisation
 1977: I. Vikheshe, Indian National Congress
 1982: I. Vikheshe, Indian National Congress
 1987: Imti Sungat Jamir, Independent
 1989: Imtisunget Jamir, Indian National Congress
 1993: S. Imtisunget Jamir, Indian National Congress
 1998: Imtisunget Jamir, Indian National Congress
 2003: Y. Hewoto Awomi, Naga People's Front
 2008: S. I. Jamir, Indian National Congress
 2013: S. I. Jamir, Indian National Congress
 2018: Moatoshi Longkümer, Naga People's Front

Election results

2018

2013

2008

See also
List of constituencies of the Nagaland Legislative Assembly
Dimapur district
 Dimapur
 Nagaland (Lok Sabha constituency)

References

Dimapur
Assembly constituencies of Nagaland